Paruparo kuehni  is a butterfly in the family Lycaenidae. It was described by Julius Röber in 1887. It is  found  in Sulawesi in the Australasian realm.

Subspecies
P. k. kuehni (Banggai, central Sulawesi)
P. k. regulus (Staudinger, 1888) (northern Sulawesi)

References

External links
"Paruparo Takanami, 1982" at Markku Savela's Lepidoptera and Some Other Life Forms

Paruparo
Butterflies described in 1887